In the First Round, 42 teams were paired 2-by-2 and played knockout matches home-and-away. The 21 winners would advance to the Second Round where they would meet the other 9 teams that qualify directly to the Second Round. Those teams are the 5 teams that qualified for the 2002 World Cup Finals (Cameroon, Nigeria, Senegal, South Africa and Tunisia) and the 4 highest-ranking teams in FIFA world rankings of 25 June 2003 (Congo DR, Ivory Coast, Egypt and Morocco).

There were 109 goals scored in 40 matches, for an average of 2.73 goals per match.

Matches 

 Mali won 4–1 on aggregate and advanced to the Second Round.

 Benin won 4–3 on aggregate and advanced to the Second Round.

 Zambia won 5–1 on aggregate and advanced to the Second Round.

 Botswana won 4–1 on aggregate and advanced to the Second Round.

 Togo won 2–1 on aggregate and advanced to the Second Round.

 Libya won 9–0 on aggregate and advanced to the Second Round.

 Kenya won 3–0 on aggregate and advanced to the Second Round.

 Algeria won 7–0 on aggregate and advanced to the Second Round.

 Uganda won 4–3 on aggregate and advanced to the Second Round.

 Sudan won 3–0 on aggregate and advanced to the Second Round.

 Zimbabwe won 4–2 on aggregate and advanced to the Second Round.

 Cape Verde won 4–1 on aggregate and advanced to the Second Round.

 Gabon won 4–1 on aggregate and advanced to the Second Round.

 Angola won on the away goals rule after tying 3–3 on aggregate and advanced to the Second Round.

 Congo won 2–1 on aggregate and advanced to the Second Round.

 Malawi won 3–1 on aggregate and advanced to the Second Round.

 Rwanda won 4–1 on aggregate and advanced to the Second Round.

 Guinea won 5–3 on aggregate and advanced to the Second Round.

 Liberia won 3–2 on aggregate and advanced to the Second Round.

 Ghana won 7–0 on aggregate and advanced to the Second Round.

 Central African Republic withdrew. Burkina Faso advanced to the Second Round.

References 

1
Qual